Antennarius bermudensis, known as the island frogfish, is a species of fish in the family Antennariidae native to the Western Atlantic. It is known from Puerto Rico, Colombia, Haiti, Venezuela, Bermuda, and the Bahamas, where it inhabits coral reefs at a depth range of 4 to 30 m (13 to 98 ft). It is a benthic oviparous fish that reaches 7.6 cm (3 inches) SL.

References 

Antennariidae
Taxa named by Leonard Peter Schultz
Fish described in 1957
Fish of the Atlantic Ocean